Trevor Lee Davis (born July 4, 1993) is an American football wide receiver who is a free agent. He played college football at California and was drafted by the Green Bay Packers in the fifth round of the 2016 NFL Draft. He has also played for the Oakland Raiders, Miami Dolphins, Chicago Bears, and Washington Football Team.

Early years
Davis was born in San Francisco, California. He attended Alhambra High School in Martinez, California. The Bulldogs football team won a conference title with Davis totaling 27 catches for 504 yards with an 11–2 record in his junior year. As a senior, he recorded 43 catches for 876 yards and nine touchdowns.

Davis also participated in track and field competing in the long jump, triple jump and sprint events. He would go on to set school records in the 100 (10.72) and 200 (22.15) meters and the long jump (23’ 6").

In an interview with ESPN Wisconsin Radio in December 2016, Davis explained that his favorite NFL team growing up was the Philadelphia Eagles, due to the fact that Donovan McNabb was his second cousin. He also said that he was able to talk to McNabb when the Green Bay Packers played at Philadelphia during his rookie season.

A 2-star recruit, Davis committed to Hawaii to play college football over an offer from Idaho.

College career

Hawaii (2011–2012)
In 2011, Davis started six games for the Rainbow Warriors. He made his first career start at Idaho on October 29, where he finished with four catches for 32 yards. Davis had a career-high seven catches for 81 yards and two touchdowns against Tulane and finished the season with six catches for a career-high 111 yards and one touchdown against BYU. He totaled 28 receptions for 336 yards and three touchdowns over his first year. As a sophomore, Davis had statistical drop where he would have 17 receptions for 235 yards and two touchdowns for the entire season. He ultimately decided to transfer from Hawaii after head coach Greg McMackin was replaced by Norm Chow.

California (2013–2015)
After his sophomore season, he transferred to California to play under head coach Sonny Dykes. At California, Davis was one of the main targets for 2016 number-one pick Jared Goff. In his final two seasons, he recorded 64 receptions for 971 yards and seven touchdowns. He also started returning kicks at California, returning two kicks for touchdowns in his junior year, leading the NCAA.

Professional career
Davis earned an invite to participate in the NFL Scouting Combine, although prior to the combine he was not considered to be on the minds of many NFL analysts.

Davis ranked in the top four out of all wide receivers at the 2016 NFL Scouting Combine in the 40-yard dash and vertical jump.

Green Bay Packers
Davis was selected in the fifth round (163rd overall) by the Green Bay Packers in the 2016 NFL Draft. When asked about his speed the Packers director of football operations Eliot Wolf said, "That was one of the main attractions, definitely." On May 6, 2016, he signed a contract with the Packers. In Week 8 against the Atlanta Falcons, Davis caught his first professional pass on a six-yard pass from quarterback Aaron Rodgers. Later that game, he caught his first career touchdown on a nine-yard pass from Rodgers. He finished the game with three receptions for 24 yards, his total for the whole season.

On September 17, 2017, in a 34–23 loss to the Atlanta Falcons in Week 2, Davis had a nine-yard reception, his first since Week 8 in 2016. In Week 14, Davis had five returns for 138 yards, including a 65-yard punt return which set up the game-tying score to force overtime against the Browns, in which the Packers won 27–21. This performance earned him NFC Special Teams Player of the Week.

On September 11, 2018, Davis was placed on injured reserve with a hamstring injury. On November 7, 2018, the Packers designated Davis to return from injured reserve. He was officially activated on November 15, 2018 prior to the team's Week 11 game. He was placed back on injured reserve on December 1, 2018 after suffering another hamstring injury in Week 12.

Oakland Raiders
On September 18, 2019, Davis was traded to the Oakland Raiders for a 2020 sixth-round pick.
Davis made his debut with the Raiders in Week 4 against the Indianapolis Colts.  In the game, Davis rushed two times for 74 yards including a 60-yard touchdown in the 31–24 win. On December 2, 2019, Davis was waived by the Raiders.

Miami Dolphins
On December 3, 2019, Davis was claimed off waivers by the Miami Dolphins.

Chicago Bears
On April 29, 2020, Davis signed with the Chicago Bears on a one-year contract, but was released on August 25, 2020.

Washington Football Team
Davis signed to the Washington Football Team's practice squad on October 28, 2020. On January 11, 2021, Davis signed a reserve/futures contract with Washington. Following the 2021 NFL Draft, Davis was released on May 3, 2021.

Atlanta Falcons
On August 5, 2021, Davis signed with the Atlanta Falcons. He was released on August 31, 2021.

Career statistics

Personal life
On April 8, 2018, Davis was arrested after making a joke at the Hawaiian Airlines counter at Los Angeles International Airport about packing an explosive. He was arrested on charges of making a criminal threat but was released after posting bail of $15,000.

References

External links
California Golden Bears bio
Hawaii Rainbow Warriors bio

1993 births
Living people
American football wide receivers
Atlanta Falcons players
California Golden Bears football players
Chicago Bears players
Green Bay Packers players
Hawaii Rainbow Warriors football players
Miami Dolphins players
Oakland Raiders players
People from Martinez, California
Players of American football from California
Sportspeople from the San Francisco Bay Area